Wanaque Reservoir is a man-made lake located within Wanaque and Ringwood, New Jersey along the Wanaque River. The reservoir came into being in 1928 by the construction of the Raymond Dam along the river in Wanaque.  Besides the Wanaque River, the reservoir receives water from two diversions:  the Pompton Lakes intake, which takes water from the Ramapo River, and the Two Bridges intake, which takes water from the Pompton River. It is the second largest reservoir in New Jersey by volume, after Round Valley Reservoir. It is the second largest body of water in New Jersey by area, after Lake Hopatcong.

Construction 
Construction of the Wanaque Reservoir represented a significant achievement in enabling the supply of potable water to local areas that didn't have safe drinking water sources. The project took quite an extensive time. After eight years of construction, water was delivered to customers for the first time in 1930. Upon completion, the Wanaque Reservoir supplied water to several member municipalities including Bloomfield, Clifton, Glen Ridge, Kearny, Montclair, Newark, Passaic, and Paterson. A major feature that came with the construction of Wanaque Reservoir was the West Brook Road Bridge. The bridge was constructed to carry the re-located West Brook Road across the Wanaque Reservoir.  Construction of the West Brook Road Bridge began in 1926 and it was opened to traffic in 1928. The bridge was to be rebuilt for safety reasons and the new bridge was completed in early 2018.

References

External links
Wanaque Reservoir Drought 2016

Lakes of Passaic County, New Jersey
Reservoirs in New Jersey
Ringwood, New Jersey